The 2018 County Championship, known as the 2018 Specsavers County Championship for sponsorship reasons, is the 119th cricket County Championship season. As in 2017, Division One has eight teams and Division Two has ten teams, with two teams relegated and two promoted at the end of the season.

The first round of matches began on 13 April and the final round of matches were scheduled to end on 27 September. Most of the matches of the Championship were played as day matches, although each team played one day-night match during the season.

In September 2018, the match between Somerset and Lancashire at Taunton finished as a tie. It was the first tie in a County Championship game since 2003, Somerset's first tied match since 1939 and Lancashire's first since 1952. By winning their game against Worcestershire between the 10th and 13 September, Surrey took an unassailable lead at the top of Division One, making them champions.

Teams 
The 2018 Championship was divided into two divisions, Division One with eight teams and Division Two with 10. Teams in both divisions played a total of 14 games, with all Division One teams playing each other twice, while Division Two teams played five others twice and four once.

Division One 
 Team promoted from Division Two in 2017

Division Two 
 Team relegated from Division One in 2017

Results
Fixtures for the 2018 County Championship were announced on 29 November 2017, with the previous season's champions Essex beginning the defence of their title against Yorkshire at Headingley.

In total, 56 matches were be played in Division One, with 70 played in Division Two.

Division One

April

May

June

July

August

September

Division Two

April

May

June

July

August

September

Standings 
Teams receive 16 points for a win, 8 for a tie and 5 for a draw. Bonus points (a maximum of 5 batting points and 3 bowling points) may be scored during the first 110 overs of each team's first innings.

Division One

Division Two

Statistics

Division One 

 Highest score by a team: Surrey − 592 all out (119.3 overs) vs Nottinghamshire (22−25 July)
 Lowest score by a team: Yorkshire − 50 all out (18.4 overs) vs Essex (4−6 May)
 Top score by an individual: Dane Vilas (Lancashire − 235* (363) vs Somerset (4−7 May)
 Best bowling figures by an individual: Jack Leach (Somerset) − 8/85 (48 overs) vs Essex (19−22 August)

Most runs

Source: ESPNcricinfo

Most wickets 

Source: ESPNcricinfo

Division Two 

 Highest score by a team: Kent − 582/9d (160.4 overs) vs Gloucestershire (9−12 June)
 Lowest score by a team: Middlesex − 56 all out (24 overs) vs Kent (25−27 June)
 Top score by an individual: Chris Dent (Gloucestershire) − 214* (290) vs Leicestershire (29 August−1 September)
 Best bowling figures by an individual: Brett Hutton (Northamptonshire) − 8/57 (18.5 overs) vs Gloucestershire (20−22 June)

Most runs

Source: ESPNcricinfo

Most wickets 

Source: ESPNcricinfo

References 

2018
County Championship